This is an incomplete list of notable applications (apps) that run on iOS where source code is available under a free software/open-source software license. Note however that much of this software is dual-licensed for non-free distribution via the iOS app store; for example, GPL licenses are not compatible with the app store.

See also
 App Store (iOS/iPadOS)
 List of iOS games

External links
 
 
 

Free mobile software
iOS applications
Lists of mobile apps